Georg Schätzel (1875–1934) was a German jurist and politician. He was a member of the Bavarian People's Party and served as the minister of post between 29 January 1927 and 1 June 1932.

Biography
Schätzel was born in Höchstadt, Bavaria, on 13 May 1875. He graduated from gymnasium in Bamberg and studied law in Munich completing his studies in 1895. He worked as a lawyer in Munich. Then he worked at the postal agency and the ministry for transport in Munich. In 1923 he became the state secretary and head of the Bavarian district of the Reich postal administration. 

Schätzel joined the Bavarian People's Party. On 29 January 1927 he was appointed minister of post which he held until 1 June 1932. During his term Schätzel served in the cabinets headed by Wilhelm Marx, Hermann Müller and Heinrich Brüning. From February to April 1929 Schätzel was also acting minister of transport.

Schätzel died in Munich on 27 November 1934.

References

External links

19th-century German lawyers
1875 births
1934 deaths
Bavarian People's Party politicians
Government ministers of Germany